Turkey participated in nine editions of eleven European Youth Summer Olympic Festivals since its establishment in 1991.

As of 2011, Turkish youth athletes have won a total of 39 medals, divided into 11 golds, 9 silvers and 19 bronzes. Turkey hosted 2011 Summer Festival and 2017 Winter Festival.

Medal tables

Medals by Summer Youth Olympic Festival

Medals by Winter Youth Olympic Festival

Medals by summer sport

Medals by winter sport

List of medalists

Summer Festivals

Winter Festivals

See also
 Turkey at the Youth Olympics
 Turkey at the Olympics
 Turkey at the Paralympics
 Turkey at the European Games
 Turkey at the Universiade

References

Youth sport in Turkey
Nations at the European Youth Olympic Festival
Turkey at multi-sport events